Elections to Hart District Council took place on 5 May 2022 as part of the 2022 United Kingdom local elections.

Results summary

Ward results

Blackwater and Hawley

Crookham East

Crookham West and Ewshot

Fleet Central

Fleet East

Fleet West

Hartley Wintney

Hook

Odiham

Yateley East

Yateley West

References

Hart
2022
2020s in Hampshire